The Aberto de Brasília is a professional tennis tournament played on outdoor hard courts. It is currently part of the ATP Challenger Tour. It is held annually in the capital of Brazil, Brasília, since 2009.

Past finals

Singles

Doubles

External links
Official Site
ITF Search

 
ATP Challenger Tour
Hard court tennis tournaments
Tennis tournaments in Brazil